Teacup refers to a small drinking vessel.

Teacup may also refer to:

Places
 Teacup, Texas, a ghost town in Kimble County, Texas
 Teacup Mountain, a mountain in Kimble County near Gentry Creek
 Teacup Lake, see the list of lakes in Beaverhead County, Montana
 Teacup Ski Trail, see the list of trails of Montana

Other uses
 Teacups, an amusement ride
 Teacup size, an unofficial term for the smallest toy dogs, dwarf cats, and miniature pigs, such as the Teacup Persian

See also
Tea bowl (disambiguation)